Ottawa USD 290 is a public unified school district headquartered in Ottawa, Kansas, United States.  The district includes the city of Ottawa and nearby rural areas.

Administration
Ottawa USD 290 is currently under the leadership of Superintendent Ryan Cobbs.

Board of Education
The Ottawa Board of Education meets on the second and fourth Mondays, of each month, at the District Office.

Schools
The school district operates the following schools:
 Ottawa High School
 Ottawa Middle School
 Sunflower Elementary School
 Garfield Elementary School
 Lincoln Elementary School

Closed
 Eisenhower Elementary School
 Hawthorne Elementary School
 Eugene Field Elementary School

See also
 Kansas State Department of Education
 Kansas State High School Activities Association
 List of high schools in Kansas
 List of unified school districts in Kansas

References

External links
 

School districts in Kansas
Education in Franklin County, Kansas
Schools in Franklin County, Kansas
School districts established in 1864
1864 establishments in Kansas